The Hillsboro Covered Bridge, known locally as the "Hillsboro-Grange City Covered Bridge", spans Fox Creek in Fleming County adjacent to Kentucky Route 111,  southeast of Flemingsburg, Kentucky.

The bridge's timbers are of yellow pine with double shouldered braces. A single 94-foot (29 m) span, it was probably built by the same contractor who constructed Ringos Mill Covered Bridge several miles up Fox Creek.  Abutments are of red stone and corrugated sheet metal covers the roof and sides. The bridge was originally double-sided with yellow poplar. The bridge is a good example of Theodore Burr's 1814 patented truss design that employs multiple kingposts. Patent bridges were the "bread and butter" of early engineers who typically received one dollar per linear foot of bridge construction for use of the patented design.

See also 
 Goddard Covered Bridge: crosses the Sand Lick Creek in Fleming County, Kentucky
 Ringos Mill Covered Bridge: also crosses the Fox Creek in Fleming County, Kentucky

References

Covered bridges on the National Register of Historic Places in Kentucky
Wooden bridges in Kentucky
Tourist attractions in Fleming County, Kentucky
National Register of Historic Places in Fleming County, Kentucky
Road bridges on the National Register of Historic Places in Kentucky
Burr Truss bridges in the United States
Transportation in Fleming County, Kentucky